Dmitry Sholudko (born 17 August 1989) is a Belarusian former professional footballer.

External links
 
 

1989 births
Living people
Belarusian footballers
Association football forwards
FC Rudziensk players
FC Isloch Minsk Raion players
FC Torpedo-BelAZ Zhodino players
FC Bereza-2010 players
FC Viktoryja Marjina Horka players